Bloodletting was an album by the rock band Boxer, released on the Virgin record label in 1979. Their third album in order of release, it had in fact been recorded in 1976 after their debut Below the Belt. It was also a posthumous release for band leader Mike Patto, who had died of lymphatic leukemia in March 1979, and for bass player Keith Ellis, who had died December 1978. Patto was credited as writer of all the album's original songs. Also featured were cover versions of "Hey Bulldog" by Lennon and McCartney, Leonard Cohen's "Teachers", "Dinah Low" by Terry Stamp and Jim Avery (who also wrote "Town Drunk" on Boxer's debut album, Below The Belt) and "The Loner" by Neil Young. The cover artwork was by Tony Wright.

Bloodletting was released on CD in 2000 by EMI.

Track listing 
"Hey Bulldog" (John Lennon, Paul McCartney) 	 	
"The Blizzard" (Mike Patto)
"Rich Man's Daughter" (Patto)	
"Big City Fever" (Patto)
"The Loner" (Neil Young)
"Why Pick on Me" (Patto)	
"Love Has Got Me" (Patto)	
"Dinah-Low" (Terry Stamp, Jim Avery)
"Teachers" (Leonard Cohen)

Personnel

Boxer
Mike Patto - lead vocals
Ollie Halsall - guitar
Keith Ellis - bass
Tony Newman - drums

Additional Personnel
Bobby Tench - guitar, backing vocals
Tim Hinkley - keyboards
Chris Stainton - keyboards
Boz Burrell - bass, backing vocals

Single 
"Hey Bulldog"/"Loony Ali" Virgin 9509 (1978) US/Europe release

Notes 

Boxer (band) albums
1976 albums
Virgin Records albums
EMI Records albums